The language of the Dima people, who lived to the east of the Omo River north of Lake Turkana, as described by Vittorio Bottego in an expedition to Ethiopia in 1897. It is known by only a few numerals, which do not obviously resemble another language.

Data
The Dima numerals 1–10 are recorded.

1 ekkā
2 ekkinā
3 dāsā
4 dəndāsā
5 osā
6 osəkər
7 fāṣā
8 orongo
9 kēriri
10 kēpēs

6 appears to be composed of 5+1.

Notes 

Unclassified languages of Africa
Languages of Ethiopia
Languages attested from the 1890s
Languages extinct in the 20th century